The 2022 FIM Moto2 World Championship was a part of the 74th F.I.M. Road Racing World Championship season. Augusto Fernández won the championship for Red Bull KTM Ajo after the Valencian Grand Prix.

Teams and riders 

All teams used series-specified Dunlop tyres and Triumph 765cc 3-cylinder engines.

Team changes 
 Petronas SRT withdrew from the category at the end of the 2021 season following the loss of their title sponsor. The team continued under the same management and different sponsor in the MotoGP class.
RW Racing GP returned to the series-dominant Kalex chassis, after four seasons operating the factory programme for Japanese chassis builder NTS.

Rider changes 
 Fabio Di Giannantonio moved up to MotoGP, as his second season in his contract clarified.
 Both Remy Gardner and Raul Fernandez moved up to MotoGP with Tech3.
 Thomas Lüthi retired at the end of the 2021 season.
 Tony Arbolino moved from Intact GP to Elf Marc VDS. Jeremy Alcoba joined the team moving up from Moto3, replacing Arbolino.
 Reigning Moto3 Riders' Champion Pedro Acosta moved up from Moto3 while remaining with Red Bull KTM Ajo. Augusto Fernández switched teams from Elf Marc VDS to join Acosta at Red Bull KTM Ajo.
 After two seasons, Arón Canet switched from Aspar Team to Pons Racing.
 Jorge Navarro moved from Speed Up to Pons Racing. Stefano Manzi and Hector Garzo left the team.
 Gabriel Rodrigo moved up to Moto2 riding with the Pertamina Mandalika SAG Team.
 Filip Salač and Alessandro Zaccone joined Gresini Racing. Nicolò Bulega, who raced for the team in 2021, moved to the Supersport World Championship.
 Sean Dylan Kelly moved from the MotoAmerica Supersport Championship to Moto2 with American Racing.
 Marcos Ramírez left American Racing to join MV Agusta Forward Racing, replacing Lorenzo Baldassarri, who moved to the Supersport World Championship.
 Romano Fenati was promoted for a second time to the Moto2 class with Speed Up Racing.
 Zonta van den Goorbergh made his debut with RW Racing GP. He previously raced in the CEV Moto3 Junior World Championship. He replaced Hafizh Syahrin, who subsequently moved to the Superbike World Championship.
 Xavi Vierge, who raced for the now defunct Petronas Sprinta Racing in 2021, moved to the Superbike World Championship.
 Niccolò Antonelli moved up to Moto2 with the VR46 Racing Team.
 Jake Dixon, who raced for the now defunct Petronas Sprinta Racing in 2021, returned to the Aspar Team, the team he raced with in the 2019 season.
 Keminth Kubo and Manuel González both made their full-time debuts with the newly-formed Yamaha VR46 Master Camp Team. Kubo appeared as a wildcard in the 2021 season and primarily raced at the CEV Moto2 European Championship, whilst González served as a replacement rider and primarily raced at the Supersport World Championship.

Mid-season changes
Barry Baltus missed the Argentine round after sustaining a broken right wrist during qualifying of the previous Indonesian round. He was not replaced. Baltus also missed the Valencian round after suffering a left foot injury during the previous Malaysian round. He was replaced by Mattia Pasini.
Keminth Kubo missed several races. He missed the Americas race after having issues with his visa. He was not replaced. He also competed during FP1 of the Spanish round, but withdrew following the diagnosis of costochondritis after FP1. He was replaced by Stefano Manzi for the race. Manzi also replaced Kubo for the succeeding French round. Kubo also missed the Catalan round to mourn the death of his father in his native Thailand. Manzi remained as his replacement for the race.
Romano Fenati parted ways with Speed Up Racing after the Spanish round and was replaced by Alonso López starting with the succeeding French round.
Gabriel Rodrigo missed the rest of the season starting from the Catalan round after undergoing surgery on his right shoulder. He was replaced by Alex Toledo for the Catalan, German, and Dutch rounds, by Piotr Biesiekirski for the British round, and by Taiga Hada for the rest of the season, starting from the Austrian round. Rodrigo eventually retired from motorcycle racing as a whole.
Pedro Acosta missed the Dutch round after suffering a broken left femur in a training accident. He was not replaced.
Sam Lowes missed the Austrian, San Marino, and Aragon rounds after suffering a dislocated shoulder during FP1 of the British round. He was replaced for all races by Senna Agius. He also missed the Valencian round due to shoulder injury. He was replaced again by Senna Agius.
Zonta van den Goorbergh missed the Malaysian round after suffering a broken left wrist during FP1 of the Australian race. He was replaced by Azroy Anuar.
Jorge Navarro missed the Malaysian and Valencian rounds after suffering a fractured femur during the Australian race. He was replaced for both races by Borja Gómez.
Simone Corsi missed the Malaysian round after injuring his right little finger during the Australian race. He was replaced by David Sanchis.

Calendar 
The following Grands Prix took place in 2022:

Grand Prix locations

Calendar changes 

 Cancelled Grands Prix in 2021 as a response to the COVID-19 pandemic, namely the Argentine, Finnish, Japanese, Thailand, Australian, and Malaysian Grands Prix, returned in 2022. Consequently, the Grands Prix held in 2021 that replaced the aforementioned cancelled races, namely the Doha, Styrian, Emilia Romagna, and Algarve Grands Prix, did not return in 2022.
 The previously mentioned Finnish Grand Prix was planned to return to the calendar after a 39-year absence. The venue hosting the round would have been the new Kymi Ring, instead of the Tampere Circuit used in 1962 and 1963 or the Imatra Circuit which hosted the round until 1982. The Grand Prix was included on both the 2020 and 2021 calendars, but both races were cancelled in response to the COVID-19 pandemic. However, the race scheduled for July was cancelled in May due to incomplete homologation works and the risks associated with the geopolitical situation in the region.
 The Indonesian Grand Prix returned to the calendar after a 24-year absence. The venue hosting the round was the new Mandalika International Street Circuit, instead of the Sentul International Circuit used in 1996 and 1997. The Grand Prix had been included in the 2021 calendar as a Reserve Grand Prix but was ultimately dropped before the end of the season.
 The Brazilian Grand Prix, which had previously been announced to return in 2022, was not included in the provisional calendar released on 7 October 2021.
 The Austrian Grand Prix used a new layout of the Red Bull Ring, wherein a chicane was added to the previous fast slight-left hander of turn 2. This was done to improve the overall safety of the track by greatly reducing the speed the riders take the turn. The final configuration was chosen among 15 proposals, with the track being 30 meters longer than the previous configurations.

Results and standings

Grands Prix

Riders' standings
Scoring system
Points were awarded to the top fifteen finishers. A rider had to finish the race to earn points.

  – Half points were awarded during the Thailand Grand Prix as less than two-thirds of the scheduled race distance (but at least three full laps) was completed.

Constructors' standings
Each constructor received the same number of points as their best placed rider in each race.

  – Half points were awarded during the Thailand Grand Prix as less than two-thirds of the scheduled race distance (but at least three full laps) was completed.

Teams' standings
The teams' standings were based on results obtained by regular and substitute riders; wild-card entries were ineligible.

  – Half points were awarded during the Thailand Grand Prix as less than two-thirds of the scheduled race distance (but at least three full laps) was completed.

Notes

References

External links 
 

Grand Prix motorcycle racing seasons